The Coca-Cola 500 was an exhibition NASCAR stock car race held on November 22, 1998, during the 1998 NASCAR Winston Cup Series season. The race took place on the Twin Ring Motegi oval course in the town of Motegi on the main Japanese island of Honshu. It was the third straight year that NASCAR held an exhibition race in Japan, previously hosting races on the Suzuka Circuit in 1996 and 1997. Teams from the Winston Cup Series, Busch Series, Craftsman Truck Series and Winston West Series made the trip to Japan to compete in the race. Four Japanese drivers entered the event, as well. The race was also the first in which Dale Earnhardt and his son, Dale Earnhardt Jr. competed against one another in a NASCAR race, driving Nos. 3 and 1 Chevrolets, respectively. The pole position was won by Jeremy Mayfield of Penske Racing South, while Mike Skinner of Richard Childress Racing won the race. Hendrick Motorsports' Jeff Gordon finished second, while Mayfield finished third.

Background
In early 1998, plans to continue hosting the NASCAR Thunder 100 at Suzuka Circuit were cancelled, and as a result, the NASCAR race in Japan was moved to the  Motegi oval. 28 cars traveled to Japan for the race, and a total of 31 drivers competed in the race, 13 from the Winston Cup Series, 11 from the Winston West Series, 2 from the Busch Series, 1 from the Craftsman Truck Series and 4 from Japan.

Qualifying
Qualifying took place on November 21. Elliott Sadler and Darrell Waltrip, filling in for the injured Dale Jarrett, rounded out the top five, while Jeff Burton, Bill Elliott, Rusty Wallace, Dale Earnhardt Jr., and Lance Norick closed out the top ten.

Race
Although Jeremy Mayfield led the first lap, Jeff Gordon claimed the lead on the ensuing lap and led until lap 21, relinquishing first to Jeff Burton. From laps 28 to 49, the lead would be exchanged by Mike Skinner and Rusty Wallace, with Sterling Marlin, Burton and Mayfield also gaining the lead afterwards. Skinner, Wallace, Burton and Mayfield would all lead laps until lap 90, when Gordon took the lead, holding it for 49 laps. On lap 139, Dale Earnhardt took the lead, but Skinner passed him and Gordon on the following lap, and led for the remainder of the race, defeating Gordon by 0.153 seconds. Gordon, Mayfield, Burton and Wallace comprised the remainder of the top five, while Dale Earnhardt Jr., Bill Elliott, Dale Earnhardt, Sterling Marlin and Michael Waltrip finished in the top ten. Scott Gaylord was the highest-finishing Winston West driver, finishing 13th.

Aftermath
In the post-race press conference, NASCAR president Mike Helton stated that since the three-year Cup Series contract to run in Japan expired after the 1998 race, the Winston West Series would hold the event as the series' season-ending race in 1999; Kevin Richards won the race. However, due to high costs for transport to the event and poor attendance, the series did not return after the 1999 race. Later in the conference, Helton was asked whether Japanese manufacturer Honda would join NASCAR, but stated that it did not "have a motor that meets specifications for NASCAR racing." National rivals Toyota would eventually join the NASCAR Craftsman Truck Series in 2004 and eventually the Cup Series in 2007.

The international exhibition race was later speculated to be moved to EuroSpeedway Lausitz in Germany. As of 2013, NASCAR has not expressed any interest in having its national series run an international exhibition race; senior vice president Steve O'Donnell stated, "We've had 20 groups approach us from China. But most of them are one-offs. We keep pushing back and saying we're going to do this but in a smart way. If you can show us how we build stock-car racing, that's something we want to pursue."

Results

Qualifying

Race results

References

1998 in Japanese motorsport
1998 NASCAR Winston Cup Series
Former NASCAR races
NASCAR races at Twin Ring Motegi
Sport in Tochigi Prefecture